"Private Lives" is the fifteenth episode of the sixth season of House. It first aired on March 8, 2010.

Plot
The team treats an avid blogger for sudden coagulopathy, but finds her difficult to treat when she insists on discussing all procedures and doctors on her blog. House notices that the blogger respects no privacy and keeps nothing secret but makes no mention of her bodily functions. This leads him to ask her about her feces and eventually to diagnosing her with Whipple's disease.

Wilson convinces House to go speed dating along with Chase, who becomes conflicted with the realization that women date him for his looks. Chase shares his concerns with Thirteen who assures him that there had been something real between him and Cameron.

Meanwhile, House and Wilson learn secrets about each other:

House discovers that in college, Wilson acted in scenes for a classmate that were later edited into a porn movie called Feral Pleasures. After House tries to see the movie by renting it, Wilson tries to prevent House from seeing it by having it returned to the store before House watches it, but House tracks down the film, and watches it. Even though Wilson tells him not to spread the word, it looks like House had already done that, as apart from posters hung up around the hospital of the movie, several people start saying or referring to a phrase spoken by the male porn actor in the movie "Be not afraid. The forest nymphs have taught me how to please a woman" to Wilson himself. 

Seeking revenge, Wilson discovers that House, an atheist, is reading sermons, which were written by who he believed to be his biological father who was a minister in church. Wilson surmises that House is studying the sermons to see if his mind was like his father's. However, when asked by Wilson if he found anything intellectual written in the book, House replies, "underneath the God stuff... more God stuff."

Music 
"The Sun Is Shining Down" by JJ Grey & Mofro.	
"Chasing Pirates" by Norah Jones is played during the Opening Scenes.
"What's It Gonna Be"	by The Dynamites is played during the Speed dating scene.
"Lochloosa" by Mofro is played during the Closing Scenes.

References

External links 

House (season 6) episodes
2010 American television episodes

fr:Private Lives
it:Episodi di Dr. House - Medical Division (sesta stagione)#Vite private